The Gyanvapi Mosque is located in Varanasi, Uttar Pradesh, India. It was constructed by Aurangzeb in 1669 upon demolition of an older Shiva temple.

Pre-mosque history

Vishweshwar temple 

The site had a Vishweshwar temple devoted to the Hindu deity Shiva. It was built by Todar Mal, a premier courtier and minister of Akbar, in conjunction with Narayana Bhatta, a pre-eminent Brahmin scholar of Banaras from Maharashtra, during late 16th century. The temple contributed to the establishment of Banaras as a vaunted center of Brahminic assembly, drawing scholars across the subcontinent esp. Maharashtra, for adjudicating a spectrum of disputes concerned with Hindu religious law.

Architectural historian Madhuri Desai hypothesizes that the temple was a system of intersecting iwans —a borrowing from Mughal architecture— with prominent pointed arches; it had a carved stone exterior.

Pre-temple History 
What might have existed at the site prior to this temple is debated by scholars. Such history has been extensively contested by the local Hindu as well as the Muslim population. Desai notes the multiple histories of the original temple and tensions arising out of the location of Gyanvapi to have fundamentally shaped the sacred topography of the city.

Recent accounts of the history of the mosque, as purveyed by Hindus, center around a litany of repeated destruction and re-construction of the original temple which is situated in contrast to the timelessness of the lingam. The original temple, located the current site of the mosque, was allegedly uprooted by Ghurids in 1193/1194 CE, upon the defeat of Jayachandra of Kannauj; the Razia Mosque was constructed in its place, a few years later. The temple would be rebuilt by a Gujarati merchant during the reign of Iltutmish (1211–1266 CE) only to be demolished by Hussain Shah Sharqi (1447–1458) or Sikandar Lodi (1489–1517). During Akbar's rule, Raja Man Singh got the temple re-constructed, but it again fell victim to Aurangzeb's intense religious zealotry.

Historicity 
Diana L. Eck finds medieval chronicles to affirm the Hindu notions of an Adi-Vishweshwar premises being the original home of the lingam; however, scholars have critiqued Eck’s non-contextual usage of medieval sources. Hans T. Bakker finds the temple destroyed in 1194 to be indeed located in current-day Gyanvapi precincts but devoted to Avimukteshwara; sometime around the late 13th century, Hindus reclaimed the vacant Gyanvapi site for a temple of Vishweshwar since the Razia mosque had occupied the "Hill of Vishweshwar". This new temple would be destroyed by the Jaunpur Sultanate, apparently to supply building materials for mosques at their new capital.

In contrast, Desai, in her reading of medieval literature, rejects the existence of any Vishweshwar temple in early-medieval Banaras; she alongside other scholars argue that it was only in the Kashikhand that Vishweshwar would be featured as the major deity of the city for the first time and even then, for centuries, it remained one among the many sacred spots of Banaras. Vishweshwar would succeed Avimukteshwara to become the principal shrine of the city only after sustained patronage of Mughals, beginning from the late sixteenth century. The Hindu claims are seen to be the building blocks of a meta-narrative about Hindu civilization being continually oppressed by Muslim invaders, which was reinforced via colonial apparatuses of knowledge production.

Establishment 

In September 1669, Aurangzeb ordered the demolition of the temple; a mosque was constructed in place, probably by Aurangzeb himself, sometime soon. The façade was modeled partially on the Taj Mahal's entrance; the plinth of the temple was left largely untouched to serve as the courtyard of the mosque, and the southern wall — along with its cusped arches, exterior moldings and toranas — was turned into the qibla wall. Other buildings in the precinct were spared.

Oral accounts indicate that notwithstanding the desecration, Brahmin priests were allowed to reside in the premises of the mosque and exert their privileges on issues of Hindu pilgrimage. The remnants of the temple, especially the plinth, continued to remain a popular hub for Hindu pilgrims. The mosque came to be known as the Alamgiri Mosque — after the name of Aurangzeb — but with time, the current name was adopted in common parlance, deriving from an adjoining sacred waterbody — Gyan Vapi ("Well of Knowledge") — which, in all likelihood, even predated the Vishweshwar temple.

Motives 
Scholars attribute political reasons rather than religious zealotry to be the primary motivation for Aurangzeb's demolition. They emphasize upon how Aurangzeb granted protection and patronage to several temples, ghats, and maths, including in Banaras, both before and after the demolition. Ian Copland and others support Iqtidar Alam Khan who concluded Aurangzeb to have built more temples than he had destroyed.

The Oxford World History of Empire notes that while Gyanvapi's demolition might be interpreted as a sign of Aurangzeb's "orthodox inclinations", local politics played an influencing role and his policies towards Hindus and their places of worship were "varied and contradictory, rather than consistently agnostic." Desai finds that Aurangzeb's complex and often-contradictory policies can be "more accurately analyzed in [the] light of his personal compulsions and political agenda, rather than as expressions of religious bigotry."

Catherine Asher, a historian of Indo-Muslim architecture, notes that not only did the zamindars of Banaras frequently rebel against Aurangzeb but also the local Brahmins were accused of interfering with Islamic teaching. Consequently, she argues that the demolition was a political message in that it served as a warning for the Zamindars and Hindu religious leaders, who wielded great influence in the city; Cynthia Talbot, Richard M. Eaton, Satish Chandra and Audrey Truschke agree on similar grounds. O' Hanlon highlights that the temple was demolished at a time when the conflict with Marathas was at its zenith. 

However, André Wink disagrees about the absence of religious motivations.

Muslim counter-claims 
Writing in 1993, Mary Searle Chatterjee found most local Muslims rejecting the idea that Aurangzeb had the temple demolished out of religious zealotry. Theories included:
 The original building was a structure of the Din-i Ilahi faith which collapsed by itself or was destroyed by Aurangzeb, out of his hostility to Akbar's heretical thought-school.
 The original building was a temple but destroyed by a Hindu merchant from Jaunpur called Jnan Chand, as a consequence of the priests having looted, violated, and murdered one of his female relatives.
 A slight variant where it was Aurangzeb who destroyed the temple after the female relative of an accompanying officer suffered such fate.
 The original building was a temple but destroyed in a communal riot, triggered by local Hindus
 Ganj-e-Arsadi — a collection of the sayings of Arsad Badr-al-Haqq of Banaras, compiled in 1721 — notes Makhdum Shah Yasin to have demolished the "big temple" (assumed to be the Vishweshwar) in late 1669 in a communal melee as retribution against local Hindus who had engaged in the repetitive demolition of an under-construction mosque. Though opposed by the local administration in light of the associated imperial patronage, Aurangzeb did not condemn Yasin and expressed relief at the act.
 The original building was a temple and was destroyed by Aurangzeb but only because it had served as a hub of political rebellion.

Maulana Abdus Salam Nomani (d. 1987), the erstwhile Imam of the Gyanvapi mosque, posited that the mosque was constructed much before Aurangzeb's reign; he claims evidence of Shah Jahan having had started a madrasah at the mosque in 1638–1639 CE. The mosque management committee, Anjuman Intezamia Masjid (AIM) supports Nomani and maintains that both the (new) Kashi Vishwanath Temple and the Gyanvapi mosque were constructed by Akbar, true to his spirit of religious tolerance. As of 2021, local Muslims emphatically reject that Aurangzeb had demolished any temple to commission the mosque.

There has been little engagement with these claims in historical scholarship; Desai reads Nomani's arguments as a strategic "rewriting of history" arising out of the Hindu-hegemonic nature of discourse in postcolonial Benaras.

Late-Mughal India 
In 1678, the Chief Minister of Lalitpur constructed the Bhaideval temple for Vishveshwara in the Patan Durbar Square — the inscription claims him to have transported Shiva from Banaras to Lalitpur since "he [Shiva] was dejected by terrible yavanas [Muslims]." In 1698, Bishan Singh, the Kachhwaha ruler of Amber, had his agents survey the town — rather its ritual landscape — and gather details about the various claims and controversies regarding the demolition of the temple; their maps ('tarah') were explicit in holding the Gyanvapi mosque to lay at the site of the dismantled Vishweshwar temple. The temple-plinth with the Gyan Vapi well (pond) in it was demarcated separately.

The Amber court went on to purchase significant land around the Gyanvapi precincts, including from Muslim inhabitants, with an aim to rebuild the temple but without demolishing the mosque yet failed. Eventually, an "Adi-Vishweshwar Temple" was constructed at the initiative of Bishan Singh's successor Sawai Jai Singh II, about 150 yards anterior to the mosque. The construction was borrowed from contemporary Mughal architecture —with Desai finding the typology to be more reminiscent of a Mughal tomb than temple— in what scholars regard as public displays of imperial patronage.

By the early 18th century, Banaras was under the effective control of the Nawabs of Lucknow. With the advent of the East India Company and increasingly severe annexation policies, multiple rulers from across the country — and even administrative elites — started investing in Brahminising Banaras, to claim cultural authority back in their homelands. The Marathas, in particular, became highly vocal about religious injustice at the hands of Aurangzeb and Nana Fadnavis proposed demolishing the mosque and reconstructing a Vishweshwar temple. In 1742, Malhar Rao Holkar proposed a similar course of action.

In spite of such consistent efforts, these plans did not materialize due to a multitude of interventions — Nawabs of Lucknow who were their political rivals, local Brahmins who feared the wrath of the Mughal court, and British authorities who feared an outbreak of communal tensions. In the late eighteenth century, as East India Company gained direct control of Banaras ousting the Nawabs, Malhar Rao's successor (and daughter-in-law) Ahilyabai Holkar constructed the present Kashi Vishwanath Temple to the immediate south of the mosque — this, however, had a markedly different spatial configuration and was ritually inconsistent. Compounded with the belief that the original lingam was hidden by the priests inside the Gyan Vapi during Aurangzeb's raid, the plinth would attract greater devotion than the temple for well over a century.

British Raj 
Under British Raj, the site, which was once the subject of whimsical Mughal politics, got transformed into a site of perennial contestation between local Hindus and Muslims spawning numerous legal suits and even, riots. A new generation of aristocrats and well-to-do traders took over the role exclusively played by petty rulers in late-Mughal India in controlling the ritual life of the city, most often under the guise of urbanization. Says Desai, that the construction of mosque had sought to air an "explicitly political and visual" assertion about the Mughal command over the city’s religious sphere but instead, "transmuted Vishweshwur into the undisputed fulcrum of the city’s ritual landscape".

The 1809 riot, widely believed to be first significant riot in N. India under Company rule, hastened the growth of competitive communalism in Banaras. An attempt by the Hindu community to construct a shrine on the "neutral" space between the Gyanvapi Mosque and the Kashi Vishwanath Temple heightened tensions. Soon enough, the festival of Holi and Muharram fell on the same day and confrontation by revelers fomented a riot. A Muslim mob killed a cow — sacred to Hindus — to spoil the sacred water of the Gyanvapi well; a Hindu mob attempted to arson the Gyanvapi Mosque and then, demolish it. Several deaths were reported and property damage ran into lacs, before the British administration quelled the riot.

Visiting in September 1824, Reginald Heber found the plinth to be more revered than Ahilyabai's temple and filled with priests and devotees; the "well", fed by a subterranean channel of the Ganges, featured a stair for the devotees to descent and take a bath. Four years later, Baiza Bai, widow of the Maratha ruler Daulat Rao Scindhia, constructed a pavilion around the well — reducing it in size —, and erected a colonnade to support a roof, pursuant to a proposal raised by member of a Peshwa family. The colonnade was based on the Gyan Mandapa, mentioned in Kashikhand but the architectural style was borrowed from contemporary Mughal Baradaris. To its east, was a statue of Nandi, which had been gifted by the Rana of Nepal. To further east, a temple of Mahadeva was constructed by the Rani of Hyderabad. In the south, two small shrines —one of marble, and the other of stone— existed.

The first legal dispute seem to have arose in 1854, when the local court rejected a plea to install a new idol in the complex. The same year, a Bengali pilgrim noted that Muslim guards were to be "either bribed or hoodwinked" to access the precincts. M. A. Sherring, writing in 1868, noted the Hindus to have claimed the plinth as well as the southern wall; the Muslims were allowed to exert control over the mosque but quite reluctantly, and permitted to only use the side entrance. A peepal tree overhanging the gateway was also venerated, and Muslims were not allowed to "pluck a single leaf from it." In 1886, adjudicating on a dispute about illegal constructions, the District Magistrate held that unlike the mosque proper, which had belonged to the Muslims exclusively, the enclosure was a common space thereby precluding any unilateral and innovative use. This principle would continue to decide multiple cases in the next few decades.

Edwin Greaves, visiting the site in 1909, found that the mosque was "not greatly used", and remained an "eyesore" to the Hindus. His description of the pavillion paralleled Sherring's. The well commanded significant devotion too — pilgrims received its sacred water from a priest, who sat on an adjoining stone-screen; the well was also covered with iron-rails to prevent suicides and devotees were not allowed direct access to the water. In the meanwhile, legal disputes continued unabated.

In 1929 and 1930, the cleric was cautioned into not letting the crowd overflow into the enclosure on the occasion of Jumu'atul-Wida, lest Hindu pilgrims face inconvenience. Subsequently, in January 1935, the mosque committee unsuccessfully demanded before the District Magistrate that the restriction on crowd-overflow be waived off; in October, it was demanded, yet unsuccessfully, that Muslims be allowed to offer prayers anywhere in the complex. In December 1935, local Muslims attacked the Police after being prevented from offering prayers outside of the mosque proper, injuring several officials. This gave way to a law-suit urging that the entire complex be treated as an integral part of the mosque — a waqf property — by customary rights, if not by legal rights; the contention was rejected by the lower Court in August 1937 and an appeal was dismissed by the Allahabad High Court with costs, in 1941.

Independent India 
In March 1959, Hindu Mahasabha conducted a Rudrabhishek ceremony at the mosque pavilion on the occasion of Maha Shivaratri. Two of their workers were subsequently sentenced to six months of imprisonment for violating law and order. This spurred fellow Mahasabha-ites to mount routine agitations at the mosque pavilion across the next few months, demanding the restoration of the temple; by July, two hundred and ninety one "satyagrahis" spread across twenty three batches had courted arrest and served imprisonments of varying duration. In November, the annual meeting of RSS adopted a resolution to similar effects.

The site continues to remain volatile — Dumper finds it to be the "focus of religious tension" in the town. Access to the mosque remains prohibited for non-Muslims, photography is prohibited, the approaching alleys have light police-pickets (alongside RAF units), the walls are fenced with barbed wire, and a watchtower exists too. The mosque is neither well-used nor embedded enough in the cultural life of the city. On the eve of the 2004 Indian general election, a BBC report noted over a thousand policemen to have been deployed around the site.

Litigation 
From 1984, the Vishva Hindu Parishad (VHP) and other elements of the Hindu nationalist Sangh Parivar engaged in a nation-wide campaign to reclaim mosques which were constructed by demolishing Hindu temples. The Gyanvapi mosque was prominently included among them. In 1991, a title-dispute suit was filed by three local Hindus in the Varanasi Civil Court on behalf of three Hindu deities — Shiva, Shringar Gauri, and Ganesha — for handing over the entire site to Hindu community to facilitate the reconstruction of temple; AIM, acting as one of the defendants, contended that the petition contravened the Places of Worship (Special Provisions) Act (henceforth PoW), which had expressly prohibited courts from entertaining any litigation that sought to convert places of worship. Nonetheless, AIM contested the idea that Aurangzeb had demolished any temple to construct the mosque. In the meanwhile, tensions increased in the wake of the demolition of the Babri mosque in December 1992, even though the Bharatiya Janata Party leaders, including those who had supported the demand for reclaiming Babri mosque, opposed the VHP's demand for the Gyanvapi Mosque since it was actively used. Further, VHP leaders issued multiple calls across the mid-90s for Hindus to congregate in large numbers on the occasion of Maha Shivaratri and worship the Shringar Gauri image at the southern wall; public response was poor and no fracas occurred due to a proactive state administration.

Hearings commenced in the civil court from June 1997. Four months later, the suit was held to be summarily barred by the PoW act. Three revision petitions were filed before the district court, by both the plaintiff and the defendants on disparate grounds, which were merged and the civil court was ordered to adjudicate the dispute, afresh, after considering all evidence. The mosque management committee successfully challenged this allowance in the Allahabad High Court, who passed an order in October 1998, staying the proceedings. After a limbo of 22 years, the Civil court recommenced proceedings after petitioners cited a SCI judgement from 2018 which had held judicial stays to have a lifetime of six months unless explicitly extended; accordingly, the petitioners requested for an ASI survey to discover evidence in their favor. AIM petitioned against the very recommencement of trial before the High Court, who granted a fresh stay and reserved judgement on the merits of whether holding such a trial would be barred by the PoW Act. Nonetheless, the request for survey was granted in April 2021 and a five-member committee of archaeologists — with two members from the Muslim community — was constituted to determine whether any temple existed at the site, prior to the mosque. AIM opposed such a survey and moved before the High Court, who, in September, criticized the judgement for wanton breach of judicial decorum and issued an indefinite stay on the survey.

On 12 May 2022, the Civil court — adjudicating on a fresh plea by five Hindu women to worship the Shrngar Gauri image at the southern wall — allowed a video-survey of the site. The survey was conducted notwithstanding local Muslim protests and accusations of bias leveraged by AIM against the appointed commissioner. In the process, an object was discovered on draining the ablution pool which was alleged to be a shivling by the petitioners leading to the Court sealing-off the area and permitting a congregation of not more than 20 people. However, AIM claimed it to be a stone fountain and days later, moved before the Supreme Court of India asking for an indefinite stay of the survey as violative of PoW Act, and vacating of all restrictions imposed on the mosque. The Supreme Court declined to grant full relief and only allowed unfettered access to the mosque, before transferring the onus of deciding on merits to the District Court.

See also
 Other notable mosques in Varanasi: Ganj-e-Shaheedan Mosque and Chaukhamba Mosque
 Conversion of non-Islamic places of worship into mosques

Notes

References

Bibliography

External links 

Religious buildings and structures converted into mosques
Mughal mosques
Mosques in Uttar Pradesh
Tourist attractions in Varanasi
Islamic rule in the Indian subcontinent
17th-century mosques
Religion in Varanasi
Religious buildings and structures completed in 1664